Cabin Fever 3 is the thirteenth mixtape by American rapper Wiz Khalifa. It was released on December 15, 2015, by Rostrum Records and Taylor Gang Records. The tape marks as the third installment to his Cabin Fever trilogy. During an interview with HipHopDX, Wiz previewed a track, which was produced by Sonny Digital. The tape features guest appearances from Kevin Gates, Curren$y, 2 Chainz, K Camp, Project Pat, Yo Gotti, Problem and King Los, along with Taylor Gang members Juicy J and Chevy Woods.

Track listing

References

2015 mixtape albums
Wiz Khalifa albums
Sequel albums
Albums produced by Easy Mo Bee
Albums produced by TM88
Albums produced by Sonny Digital